Clyde Wright (born February 20, 1941), nicknamed "Skeeter", is an American former professional baseball player. A left-handed pitcher, he played all or part of ten seasons in Major League Baseball for the California Angels (1966–73), Milwaukee Brewers (1974) and Texas Rangers (1975). He also pitched three seasons in Japan for the Yomiuri Giants (1976–78). He is the father of Jaret Wright.

Amateur career 
Wright was a star pitcher at Carson-Newman College, whom he helped pitch to the 1965 NAIA Baseball World Series title. During that World Series, Wright struck out 22 batters in one game—to date, an NAIA World Series record.

Major leagues 
Wright defeated the Minnesota Twins on a four-hitter in his Major League debut on June 15, 1966. He was a spot starter for the Angels in his first two seasons, and in 1968 won 10 games while losing six, pitching mostly in relief.

In 1969, Wright won only one game with eight losses and a 4.10 earned run average; after the season, the Angels waived him. Teammate Jim Fregosi convinced Wright to accompany him to winter ball, where the pitcher experimented with a screwball and changeup.

Wright returned to the Angels in 1970 and had the best season of his career. He won 22 games to become only the second 20-game winner in franchise history (Dean Chance had won 20 games in 1964) and established a career-low 2.83 ERA, which earned him the American League Comeback Player of the Year Award. Wright also no-hit the Oakland Athletics 4-0 at Anaheim Stadium on July 3 of that year, the first no-hitter pitched in that stadium. The day was doubly memorable for Wright: in a pre-game ceremony, he had been inducted into the NAIA Hall of Fame.

Wright's no-hitter finished with Sandy Alomar Sr. converting Felipe Alou's ground ball into a double play. Like Wright, Alomar and Alou had sons who would play Major League Baseball: Alomar is the father of Sandy Jr. and Roberto, and Alou is the father of Moises. Jaret Wright, Sandy Alomar Jr. and Moisés Alou all participated in the 1997 World Series: Alomar Jr. was Jaret Wright's catcher with the Cleveland Indians, and Moises Alou was a starting outfielder for the victorious Florida Marlins.

The 22-win season made Clyde Wright, to date, the only Angel left-hander to win 20 games in a season. 22 wins also remains tied as a franchise record, Nolan Ryan having equaled it in 1974.

Wright was selected to the All-Star team in 1970, the only All-Star selection of his career. He was the losing pitcher of the game (which was played at the newly opened Riverfront Stadium eleven days after his no-hitter), giving up the single to fellow Tennessee native Jim Hickman (his eventual 1970 National League Comeback Player of the Year counterpart) in the 12th inning, which drove in Pete Rose for the winning run, Rose barreling over Cleveland Indian catcher Ray Fosse to score the run. The game's winning pitcher was also a native Tennessean – Claude Osteen.

Wright went 16-17 in 1971 with a 2.99 ERA and a career-high 135 strikeouts, and 18-11 in 1972 with a 2.98 ERA, before falling to 11-19 with a 3.68 ERA in 1973. Injuries were a cause for the struggles; Wright had so much back pain in 1973 that he could not even bend over. He was involved in a nine-player transaction when he was sent along with Steve Barber, Ken Berry, Art Kusnyer and cash from the Angels to the Brewers for Ellie Rodríguez, Ollie Brown, Joe Lahoud, Skip Lockwood and Gary Ryerson on October 23, 1973. In 1974 he became the first 20-game loser in the franchise's history (9-20). He was traded from the Brewers to the Rangers for Pete Broberg at the Winter Meetings on December 5, 1974. He pitched one season in Texas, and was then released just prior to the start of the 1976 season.

Nippon Professional Baseball 
Not long after his release from the Rangers, Wright went to Japan, and signed with the Yomiuri Giants. He pitched for them for three seasons, but his stay in Japan almost ended before the first season was over. Early in that first season, manager Shigeo Nagashima pulled Wright from a game tied at 1-1 in the sixth inning, after Wright allowed the first two batters to reach base. Wright refused to hand over the ball, then charged off the mound and fired the ball into the dugout. He then went into the clubhouse, where he tore off his uniform and threw it into a bathtub, which gave rise to another nickname, "Crazy Wright". This nickname stuck with him throughout his stay in Japan. Fans and sportswriters called for Wright's release, but Nagashima defended his pitcher.

Wright eventually became popular by throwing baseballs into the stands for young fans. He went 8-7 in that first season with the Giants and won Game 5 of the Japan Series, hitting a home run in that game. However, he lost Game 7 on two late-inning home runs; he had told an interpreter to ask the team to remove him due to fatigue.

Retirement 
Wright feared he was an alcoholic after his Major League Baseball days. He began drinking heavily while in Japan, and over the next few years the problem worsened. In 1996 he told the Los Angeles Times that in 1979, his wife Vicki gave him an ultimatum: stop drinking or she would divorce him. "I went golfing one day and then drinking and when I came home, she was gone. When she came back, Jaret was in the van. I went to open the door and he pushed the lock down. He was 3 years old." Clyde Wright has not had a drink since.

After retiring as a pitcher, Wright opened the Clyde Wright Pitching School at Home Run Park batting cages in Anaheim, California, where he gave pitching lessons for four decades before retiring. Wright now does public relations for the Angels.

References

External links

Clyde Wright at SABR (Baseball BioProject)
Boxscore of Wright's no-hitter

Major League Baseball pitchers
California Angels players
Milwaukee Brewers players
Texas Rangers players
Yomiuri Giants players
American League All-Stars
Quad Cities Angels players
El Paso Sun Kings players
Seattle Angels players
American expatriate baseball players in Japan
Carson–Newman Eagles baseball players
Baseball players from Tennessee
People from Jefferson City, Tennessee
1941 births
Living people